Carmen Belén Núñez (born 25 December 1957) is a Spanish diver. She competed at the 1972 Summer Olympics, the 1976 Summer Olympics and the 1980 Summer Olympics.

References

1957 births
Living people
Spanish female divers
Olympic divers of Spain
Divers at the 1972 Summer Olympics
Divers at the 1976 Summer Olympics
Divers at the 1980 Summer Olympics
Place of birth missing (living people)